I Wish You Loved Me is a song by American singer Tynisha Keli from her debut album The Chronicles of TK.
The single was written by Rico Love and produced by Tha Cornaboyz.  The world premiere of the single was released through iTunes, September 7, 2007.  It first appeared on Billboard's Bubbling Under Hot 100 Singles chart on the week of August 9, 2008 and peaked at #13.  The official remix features Sammie.

Official Track Listing (The Chronicles of TK)

Premium Edition (CD)

Music video
The video was shot in and outside a building.  The scenario was mostly beauty shots, sitting with friends, and shots of the love interest.  On Tynisha's official Kyte Channel she had said the video was supposed to be a viral video and not the actual video.

Charts

References

2007 singles
Tynisha Keli songs
Songs written by Rico Love
2007 songs
Warner Records singles
Songs written by Pierre Medor